The 2005 FIVB Women's World Grand Champions Cup was held in Tokyo and Nagoya, Japan from November 15–20, 2005.

Teams

Squads

Competition formula
The competition formula of the 2005 Women's World Grand Champions Cup is the single Round-Robin system. Each team plays once against each of the 5 remaining teams. Points are accumulated during the whole tournament, and the final standing is determined by the total points gained.

Venues
Nagoya Rainbow Hall (Nagoya)
Tokyo Metropolitan Gymnasium (Tokyo)

Results

|}

Tokyo round

|}

Nagoya round

|}

Final standing

Team Roster
Fabiana, Carol, Natália, Carol Gattaz, Fernanda, Valeskinha, Sassá, Marcelle, Jaqueline, Sheilla, Fabi, Renatinha
Head Coach: Zé Roberto

Awards
MVP:  Sheilla Castro
Best Scorer:  Sheilla Castro
Best Spiker:  Zhou Suhong
Best Blocker:  Fabiana Claudino
Best Receiver:  Zhou Suhong
Best Server:  Welissa Gonzaga
Best Setter:  Feng Kun
Best Digger:  Yuka Sakurai

External links
Official Website of the 2005 Women's World Grand Champions Cup

FIVB Volleyball Women's World Grand Champions Cup
World Grand Champions Cup
FIVB Women's World Grand Champions cup
V